is a biography series produced by Tsuburaya Productions created to commemorate the 10th anniversary of Ultraman Zero. Featuring Riku Asakura, he navigates the viewers to compilation clips featuring Zero's appearance throughout past media, in addition to his exploits in Ultraman Geed. The show premiered on January 11, 2020, on the Japanese television network TV Tokyo at the time of 9:00 am.

Episodes

Cast
: 
: 
:

Voice actors
, Alien Pegassa (2, 3, 5, 6): 
: 
: 
: 
: 
: 
: 
: 
:

Theme song
"Heroes"
Lyrics: Ryota Fujimaki, 
Composition, Arrangement, & Artist: 
Episodes: 1–12, 23 (Verse 1); 13-23 (Verse 2)

References

External links
Ultraman Chronicle Zero & Geed at TV Tokyo 

2020 Japanese television series debuts
TV Tokyo original programming
Ultra television series